Theodore Carl Diers (December 4, 1880 – December 11, 1942) was an American actor, politician, and writer who served in the Wyoming House of Representatives and Wyoming Senate as a member of the Democratic Party.

Early life

Theodore Carl Diers was born in Seward, Nebraska, to Herman Diers and Anna Schulte on December 4, 1880, and was educated in Seward public schools. In 1897, he graduated from the Lincoln Business College and became a bookkeeper at the First National Bank of Seward. In 1902, he went to New York to become an actor and attended the Chicago Musical College and while in Chicago he studied vocals under Oscar Saenger and piano under Rudolph Ganz. In 1909, he moved to Clearmont, Wyoming and became a cashier at the Clearmont State Bank until 1910, when he became a cashier at the Citizens' State Bank of Sheridan. In 1911, he became the president of the Clearmont State Bank. In 1931, he received a BFA degree from the University of Nebraska.

Career

Politics

During World War I he served as the Federal Food Administrator for Wyoming. From 1913 to 1915, he served in the Wyoming House of Representatives. Diers then served in the Wyoming Senate from 1915 to 1919, to succeed John B. Kendrick, who was elected as governor, and was a member of the Mines and Mineral Products, Sanitary and Medical Affairs, Railroads and Transpiration, and Judiciary committees. In 1920, he served as the chairman of the Wyoming Democratic Party's state convention and was a member of the resolutions committee at the 1920 Democratic National Convention.

Music

In 1924, he joined the staff of Transylvania University. In 1925, he became the radio director for the University of Nebraska and in 1932, became the supervisor of the university's music division and served in both positions until November 30, 1940, when he resigned to become the Nebraska Federal Music Project music supervisor. In 1929, he became the secretary of the Nebraska Writers Guild and served until 1940.

Death

On December 11, 1942, he died at his home in Lincoln, Nebraska from a heart attack and following his death "A Prayer for Peace", one of his unpublished songs, was sung by Carl Schaefer at his funeral.

References

External links

T.C. Diers at the Internet Broadway Database

1880 births
1942 deaths
19th-century American male actors
American male stage actors
20th-century American composers
20th-century American politicians
American male musical theatre actors
Chicago Musical College alumni
Democratic Party members of the Wyoming House of Representatives
Musicians from Nebraska
Nebraska Democrats
Politicians from Lincoln, Nebraska
People from Seward, Nebraska
People from Sheridan, Wyoming
People of the New Deal arts projects
Transylvania University faculty
United States home front during World War I
University of Nebraska alumni
University of Nebraska–Lincoln faculty
Writers from Nebraska
Democratic Party Wyoming state senators
20th-century American male singers
20th-century American singers